Little Fencote is a small village in the Hambleton District of North Yorkshire, England.

References

External links

Villages in North Yorkshire